The Arlington County Sheriff's Office (ACSO) provides law enforcement services for 207,627 people within  of jurisdiction within Arlington County, Virginia. These services include responsibility for the operation of the local jail, courthouse security and service of civil papers. The Sheriff may also execute criminal warrants. Unlike the Arlington County Police Department, it is not responsible for patrol or investigations.

History
The ACSO was created in 1869 when I.C. O'Neil was appointed as the first sheriff. The ACSO is a Nationally Accredited Public Safety Agency.

In 2016, the office settled with the federal government over alleged violations of the Americans with Disabilities Act of 1990 regarding a deaf prison inmate.

In 2022, after seven men of color had died in the Arlington county jail over the previous seven years, the Arlington branch of the NAACP requested a federal investigation of the county jail. A $10 million lawsuit was independently filed regarding one of these deaths.

Organization
The ACSO has 270 sworn civilian personnel.

Jail
The facility employs a total of approximately 200 staff members, 160 being Deputy Sheriffs.

See also 

 List of law enforcement agencies in Virginia
 Arlington County Police Department

References

External links

Arlington County Sheriff
County sheriffs' offices of Virginia
Government agencies established in 1869
1869 establishments in Virginia